The 1980 Colgate Red Raiders football team was an American football team that represented Colgate University as an independent during the 1980 NCAA Division I-A football season. In its fifth season under head coach Frederick Dunlap, the team compiled an identical record to the previous year, 5–4–1. Jeff King and Gene Young were the team captains. 

The team played its home games at Andy Kerr Stadium in Hamilton, New York.

Schedule

Leading players 
Two trophies were awarded to the Red Raiders' most valuable players in 1980: 
 Tony Bubniak, center, received the Andy Kerr Trophy, awarded to the most valuable offensive player.
 Jeff King, defensive tackle, received the Hal W. Lahar Trophy, awarded to the most valuable defensive player.

Statistical leaders for the 1980 Red Raiders included: 
 Rushing: Tom McChesney, 544 yards and 5 touchdowns on 122 attempts
 Passing: Wayne Schuchts, 1,556 yards, 101 completions and 10 touchdowns on 206 attempts
 Receiving: Tom Rogers, 720 yards and 4 touchdowns on 46 receptions
 Total offense: Wayne Schuchts, 1,652 yards (1,556 passing, 96 rushing)
 Scoring: Brian Byrne, 52 points from 25 PATs and 9 field goals
 All-purpose yards: Rich Erenberg, 1,261 yards (496 rushing, 396 kickoff returning, 293 receiving, 76 punt returning)
 Tackles: Joe Murphy, 123 total tackles
 Sacks: Kelly Robinson, 9.5 quarterback sacks

References

Colgate
Colgate Raiders football seasons
Colgate Red Raiders football